The following is a list of schools in North Western Province, Sri Lanka.

Kurunegala District

National schools

Provincial schools

Private schools

International Schools

Special Schools

Puttalam District

National schools

| Chilaw 
| Chilaw
| St.Mary's College,chilaw
| 1AB
|1662
|}

Provincial schools

Private schools

International schools

Special Schools

References

 
North Western Province